Department for Child Protection was part of the Government of Western Australia.

It was created in response to a critical review of the Department of Community Development in January 2007.  At the time of its establishment, the government also mandated reporting of child sexual abuse.

In July 2017, the department was amalgamated with the Department of Housing, the Department of Local Government and Communities and the Disability Services Commission to form the Department of Communities.

Responsibilities
The Department administers Acts and Regulations which include the following:
 Adoption Act 1994
 Adoption Regulations 1995
 Children and Community Services Act 2004
 Children and Community Services Regulations 2006
 Parental Support and Responsibility Act 2008
 Parental Support and Responsibility Regulations 2009
 Working with Children (Criminal Record Checking) Act 2004
 Working with Children (Criminal Record Checking) Regulations 2005.

The Children and Community Services Act 2004, came into operation on 1 March 2006, the Department came into existence on 1 July 2007

The legislation that governs the Department’s three service areas:

 Supporting children and young people in the Chief Executive Officer’s care.
 Protecting children and young people from abuse.
 Supporting individuals and families at risk or in crisis.

The Department also has the capacity for information sharing where it benefits child protection

Former agencies 
(Other agencies might have had overlap in relation to Aboriginal children, but these are the main names
 1908 - 1917 Public Charities and State Children's Department. 
 1917 - 1927 State Children's Department.
 1927 - 1972 Child Welfare Department.
 1972 - 1985 Department for Community Welfare
 1985 - 1992 Department for Community Services
 1992 - 1995 Department for Community Development
 1995 - 2001 Department for Family and Children's Services
 2001 - 2007 Department for Community Development

See also
 Aboriginal child protection#Australia
 Protecting Victoria’s Vulnerable Children Inquiry

Notes

External links
 http://www.dcp.wa.gov.au/Pages/Home.aspx - the Departments main website

Child protection
Child welfare in Australia
Child abuse-related organizations
Child abuse in Australia
Parents' organizations
Family in Australia
Social affairs ministries
2007 establishments in Australia
Government agencies established in 2007
2017 disestablishments in Australia
Government agencies disestablished in 2017